Arturo Palma di Cesnola (14 March 1928 – 9 July 2019)Firenze is an Italian archaeologist. He has worked extensively on the Italian Upper Palaeolithic.

He was also among the first Italian researchers to popularise in Italy Laplace's "analytical typology" for describing stone tools.

References 

2019 deaths
1928 births
Italian archaeologists